Skitnica (Serbo-Croatian for vagabond) may refer to:

Skitnica (Šako Polumenta album), 1995
Skitnica (Marinko Rokvić song), 2003 album by Marinko Rokvić
"Skitnica" (song), 1984 by Jasna Zlokić